Howard Lake is a city in Wright County, Minnesota, United States. The population was 1,962 at the 2010 census.

Geography

The town of Howard Lake sits on the south shore of Howard Lake. Other area lakes include Mallard Pass Lake, Lake Ann, Dutch Lake, and Smith Lake.

Infrastructure

Transportation
U.S. Highway 12 serves as a main route in Howard Lake.

History
The area was first settled by the Dakota, then, in 1855, by Morgan V. Cochran, who later sold his land to Charles Goodsell in 1863. Howard Lake developed as a railroad station.

Howard Lake was platted in 1869, and named after nearby Howard Lake. A post office was established under the name Howard in 1870; the post office was renamed Howard Lake in 1892 and remains in operation.  One property in Howard Lake, the 1904 Howard Lake City Hall, is listed on the National Register of Historic Places.

Demographics

2010 census
As of the census of 2010, there were 1,962 people, 786 households, and 518 families living in the city. The racial makeup of the city was 96.5% White, 0.6% African American, 0.3% Native American, 0.2% Asian, 0.1% Pacific Islander, 1.5% from other races, and 0.8% from two or more races. Hispanic or Latino of any race were 4.7% of the population.

There were 786 households, of which 35.9% had children under the age of 18 living with them, 50.5% were married couples living together, 10.1% had a female householder with no husband present, 5.3% had a male householder with no wife present, and 34.1% were non-families. 30.2% of all households were made up of individuals, and 10.2% had someone living alone who was 65 years of age or older. The average household size was 2.42 and the average family size was 2.98.

The median age in the city was 36.5 years. 27.1% of residents were under the age of 18; 6.6% were between the ages of 18 and 24; 29.5% were from 25 to 44; 22.2% were from 45 to 64; and 14.7% were 65 years of age or older. The gender makeup of the city was 48.0% male and 52.0% female.

2000 census
As of the census of 2000, there were 1,853 people, 735 households, and 490 families living in the city. The racial makeup of the city was 98.27% White, 0.27% African American, 0.16% Native American, 0.38% Asian, 0.49% from other races, and 0.43% from two or more races. Hispanic or Latino of any race were 1.03% of the population. 52.1% were of German, 8.9% Norwegian, 7.3% Swedish and 5.8% American ancestry according to Census 2000.

There were 735 households, out of which 34.1% had children under the age of 18 living with them, 51.7% were married couples living together, 10.6% had a female householder with no husband present, and 33.2% were non-families. 27.9% of all households were made up of individuals, and 12.4% had someone living alone who was 65 years of age or older.  The average household size was 2.52 and the average family size was 3.10.

In the city, the population was spread out, with 28.4% under the age of 18, 9.0% from 18 to 24, 30.1% from 25 to 44, 18.6% from 45 to 64, and 13.9% who were 65 years of age or older.  The median age was 33 years. For every 100 females, there were 91.0 males.  For every 100 females age 18 and over, there were 89.6 males.

The median income for a household in the city was $38,015, and the median income for a family was $49,327. Males had a median income of $32,500 versus $25,040 for females. The per capita income for the city was $17,900.  About 5.8% of families and 9.4% of the population were below the poverty line, including 13.0% of those under age 18 and 7.3% of those age 65 or over.

Politics

Economy
The Dura Supreme Cabinetry headquarters is in Howard Lake.

Principal employers
The principal employers in the city are:

Dura Supreme has been known to make other things like plastic shelves

Notable people

 Harold J. Dahl (1930-1989), Minnesota state legislator, judge, and lawyer, lived in Howard Lake.
 Paul L. Eddy, Minnesota state legislator
 Tim Foecke, American metallurgist, graduated from Howard Lake - Waverly High School in 1982.

References

External links
 
 City of Howard Lake, MN – Official Website
 Howard Lake Community Guide
 Herald Journal newspaper site
 City-Data.com
 ePodunk: Profile for Howard Lake, Minnesota

Cities in Minnesota
Cities in Wright County, Minnesota